Penge East railway station is on the Chatham Main Line in England, serving part of the Penge and Sydenham areas in the London Borough of Bromley, south London.

The station and all trains that call are operated by Southeastern, as part of the Bromley South Metro service. Penge East is in Travelcard Zone 4.

History

The station is 7.2 miles (11 km) from London Victoria on the Chatham Main Line and was opened on 1 July 1863. It was built by the London, Chatham and Dover Railway and originally known as Penge (LCDR) or Penge Lane, and was renamed Penge East on 9 July 1923. When the line was built a level crossing was built where the line crossed the old alignment of Penge Lane (now Newlands Park and St John's Road). When the level crossing was closed in about 1879, Penge Lane traffic was diverted down what are now Lennard Road, Parish Lane and the current Penge Lane.

The covered footbridge with its corrugated roof dates from the 1880s and is a listed structure. The station is close to the South-Eastern portal of Penge Railway Tunnel.

Services 
All services at Penge East are operated by Southeastern using  and  EMUs.

The typical off-peak service in trains per hour is:
 2 tph to 
 2 tph to  via 

During the peak hours, additional services between London Victoria and Bromley South call at the station increasing the service to 4 tph in each direction.

Connections
London Buses routes 75, 194, 227, 176, 354 and 197 serve the station.

See also
Murder of Deborah Linsley – Unsolved murder of a woman in 1988, in which the attacker was believed to have got onto the woman's carriage at Penge East

References

External links 

Kent Rail page on Penge East

Railway stations in the London Borough of Bromley
Former London, Chatham and Dover Railway stations
Railway stations in Great Britain opened in 1863
Railway stations served by Southeastern
Grade II listed buildings in the London Borough of Bromley